Alan Rockwell Abraham  (1 February 1931 – 2 October 2020) was the 27th Lieutenant Governor of Nova Scotia.

Career
Abraham, an engineering graduate from Saint Mary's University was involved in federal politics and helped with the organization of Prime Minister Pierre Trudeau's tours of the Maritimes. In 1983, Governor General Edward Schreyer, on the advice of Prime Minister Trudeau, appointed Abraham Lieutenant Governor of Nova Scotia. Abraham was the second youngest appointee as Lieutenant Governor of Nova Scotia since Confederation at the time of his appointment. He was then age 53; one of his predecessors, Hon. James Robson Douglas of Amherst, was 49 when he was appointed in 1925. Abaraham died in 2020 at the age of 89.

Awards and recognition

  

In 1996, he was made a Member of the Order of Canada. He received the Order of Nova Scotia when it was established in 2002.

References 

1931 births
2020 deaths
Lieutenant Governors of Nova Scotia
Members of the Order of Canada
Members of the Order of Nova Scotia
Saint Mary's University (Halifax) alumni